Toxicology and Industrial Health is a peer-reviewed medical journal that covers research in the fields of occupational health and toxicology. The editor-in-chief is Anthony L. Kiorpes. The journal was established 1985 and is published by SAGE Publications.

Abstracting and indexing
The journal is abstracted and indexed in Scopus and the Social Sciences Citation Index. According to the Journal Citation Reports, its 2015 impact factor is 1.688.

References

External links

SAGE Publishing academic journals
English-language journals
Waste management journals
Toxicology journals
Publications established in 1985
Environmental health journals